Ponerorchis gracilis (synonym Amitostigma gracile) is a species of plant in the family Orchidaceae. It is commonly known as delicate amitostigma. It is widespread across much of eastern Asia. It has been reported from Japan, Korea, Taiwan, and China (Anhui, Fujian, Guangxi, Guizhou, Hebei, Henan, Hubei, Hunan, Jiangsu, Liaoning, Shaanxi, Shandong, Sichuan, and Zhejiang).

Taxonomy
The species was first described by Carl Ludwig Blume in 1856, as Mitostigma gracile. It has been placed in various genera, including Gymnadenia, Orchis and Amitostigma. A molecular phylogenetic study in 2014, in which it was included as Amitostigma gracile, found that species of Amitostigma, Neottianthe and Ponerorchis were mixed together in a single clade, making none of the three genera monophyletic as then circumscribed. Amitostigma and Neottianthe were subsumed into Ponerorchis, with this species becoming Ponerorchis gracilis.

References

External links 
 IOSOPE Orchid Species photos
 Biglobe, ヒナラン, 雛蘭 tiny orchid Amitostigma gracile
 Garden Talking, Amitostigma gracile 
 Nature Library,  无柱兰 （Amitostigma gracile）

gracilis
Orchids of Japan
Orchids of Korea
Orchids of China
Orchids of Taiwan
Plants described in 1836